Sandalwood Death is a 2001 novel by Nobel prize-winning author Mo Yan. The English version, translated by Howard Goldblatt, was released in 2013 by the University of Oklahoma Press.

Plot summary
Maoqiang (猫腔) opera singer Sun Bing, a leader of the Boxer Rebellion, is sentenced to death for attacking at the hands of his daughter's father-in-law, an executioner known for killing by "sandalwood death," a slow method of punishment in which the victim is skewered with a cured sandalwood rod.

In his author's note, Yan writes that he had difficulty telling friends what his book was about, eventually electing to tell them it was "all about sound."

References

2001 Chinese novels
Novels by Mo Yan